Pasgen ap Cyngen was a mid 6th century King of Powys, and son of Cyngen Glodrydd.

References 

House of Gwertherion
Monarchs of Powys
6th-century Welsh monarchs